Eglwyswrw  is a village, community and parish in the former Cantref of Cemais, Pembrokeshire, Wales.

The village is in the heart of the Welsh-speaking area of Pembrokeshire; its history goes back at least to Norman times and there are 19 listed buildings in the community.

History

There is much of archaeological interest in and around Eglwyswrw community, and the village is recorded from Norman times; on the west side of the village is a small Norman motte, designated Castell Eglwyswrw by Coflein.

The sacred nature of the site where the church now stands (see also Worship, below) may date back to before the 8th century, but there was a later Norman church, the earliest record of which is in 1291. A 1578 map in the British Library shows Eglwyswrw parish as Eglosserrow, possibly an English phonetic rendering of the name.

The village hosted several important fairs, including Meigan Fair (Ffair Feigan) at least as early as 1794. A report in 1915 listed animal prices and noted a decline in horse prices.

In the mid-19th century, the parish of Eglwyswrw covered .

In 1895, following the death of local landowner W. Mathias, property and land covering nearly the whole of the village was auctioned in 16 lots for a total sum of nearly £7,000; some of the property, which included two pubs, the Butchers Arms and The Plough, was bought by tenants.

Villager Stephen Lewis celebrated his 102nd birthday in 1923. He had been a local schoolmaster at the age of 13, but spent most of his life as a farm worker. He died aged 103, reportedly never having seen a doctor.

Eglwyswrw War Memorial lists the names of 24 servicemen of the parish who lost their lives in World War 1, and one in World War 2. In 2014 a new War Memorial was erected in the churchyard.

The Serjeants Inn, now a private residence, was a Grade II-listed public house dating back to the 17th or 18th century, so named because the Cemais Assizes were held there. It closed in the 1990s. To the rear of the inn is a former meeting house which served as a chapel and a school in the 19th century. The coach house on the west side of the inn is also Grade II-listed, as is the Armoury, or former stables. The Butcher's Arms, the village's other pub, featured in a 2004 Canadian Visa campaign highlighting difficult-to-pronounce placenames around the world. There was irony in the fact that the pub did not accept Visa cards. The village shop and Post Office closed in 2009. 

In January 2016 Eglwyswrw was judged to be the wettest village in Britain for 92 years, having suffered rainfall on 85 consecutive days since 26 October 2015, five days short of the British record.

In 2022, Eglwyswrw became the first place in the UK to have an off-grid mobile phone mast.

Significant sites
The 2008 Royal Commission on the Ancient and Historical Monuments of Wales listed 85 sites of importance within the community of Eglwyswrw.

Demographics
The population has remained fairly constant in the mid-hundreds since the beginning of the 19th century (OPCS):

Administration

Eglwyswrw has its own elected community council and is part of the Cilgerran electoral ward for the purposes of elections to Pembrokeshire County Council. The community of Eglwyswrw includes the parish of Meline, the north part of Llanfair-Nant-Gwyn and the south-eastern part of Nevern, including Brynberian. Crymych ward was 60% Welsh-speaking in 2011, a small decrease from 63% in 2001.

Amenities
As well as self-catering accommodation, Eglwyswrw features a parish church, Norman remains, a community school and nearby attractions. An agricultural stores, petrol station and shop is half a mile south of the village at the junction of the A487 and B4329 roads.

Worship
The Welsh placename of the village means "church of St Eirw", and there once existed a chantry attached to the churchyard, in which this minor female saint was allegedly interred. A mediaeval church of unknown date succeeded the Norman church, and it was noted in 1504 that the chancel was "ruinous, and the windows not glazed", with the blame falling on the Vicar, Dom. Phillip Lloyd. Similar accusations were made in 1684. In 1708 the church (then called Eglwys Yrrow) was reported as in good repair.

The present parish church of Saint Cristiolus is situated in the centre of the village and dates from before 1829 when it was restored. The vicar in 1855 was the Reverend Thomas Evans, replacing the Reverend D. Prothero who had died. The church was restored again in 1883 by local contractor Evan Evans, an event reported in depth by the Western Mail, which suggested that a church had existed in Eglwyswrw since 1150. The vicar in 1888 was the Reverend T. M. Jones, who was summonsed for non-payment of poor rates due on tithes, but as a result of legal arguments the case was dismissed.

Elim Baptist Mission Room opened in 1839 and closed about 1937.

Education
Ysgol Gymunedol Eglwyswrw is a Welsh-medium primary school situated in the village. As of 2022, there were 92 pupils on roll at the school. 76.5 per cent of the school's pupils are from Welsh-speaking homes.

Attractions
Dyfed Shire Horse Farm is half a mile to the south-west of the village on the A487 at its junction with the B4329 scenic route to Haverfordwest over the Preseli Mountains. The farm has provided horses for military parades, and H.M. The Queen named a foal in 2020 in recognition of the foal's uncle serving in the Household Cavalry, and the foal being born on the Queen's birthday. A little further on the A487 is Castell Henllys, a reconstructed Iron Age Fort. Bro Meigan Gardens (6.5 acres) are a mile to the east of the village.

References

External links

Photos of Eglwyswrw and surrounding areas on geograph.org.uk
Eglwyswrw & District Heritage Society
British History Online: Edern-Eidda

Villages in Pembrokeshire
Communities in Pembrokeshire